Parliamentary elections were held in Norway on 12 and 13 September 1965. The Labour Party remained the largest party, winning 68 of the 150 seats. However, the four non-socialist parties succeeded in winning a majority between them and forming a government. Per Borten, the leader of the Centre Party, became Prime Minister.

Results

Seat distribution

Notes

References

1965
1965
Norwegian parliamentary election
Parliamentary election
Norwegian parliamentary election